Saleux is a commune in the Somme department in Hauts-de-France in northern France. The baritone Numa Auguez (1847–1903) was born in Saleux.

Geography

Population

See also
Communes of the Somme department

References

External links

 Official commune website

Communes of Somme (department)